George Moran (October 3, 1881 – August 1, 1949) was an American minstrel show performer who worked in blackface. He worked with Charles Mack as the Two Black Crows from 1921 to 1930. He also portrayed Native Americans in comedy films.

Biography
He was born on October 3, 1881, in Elwood, Kansas, as George Searcy. He died on August 1, 1949, in Oakland, California.

Selected filmography
 The Fatal Glass of Beer (1933) as Indian Chief
 My Little Chickadee (1940) as Milton, a Native American
 Alias the Deacon (1940) as Taciturn Indian

References

External links

1881 births
1949 deaths
Blackface minstrel performers
Vaudeville performers
20th-century American male singers
20th-century American singers